The president of the Legislative Assembly of Madeira is the speaker of the regional parliament of this autonomous region of Portugal.

The position was created in 1976 after the newly enacted Constitution of Portugal, which followed the 1974 Revolution, granted legislative autonomy to the Azores and Madeira archipelagoes, thus establishing the Portuguese Autonomous Regions and the respective governing bodies. It is analogous to the position of president of the Legislative Assembly of the Azores and both are equally 14th in the Portuguese order of precedence, being this the highest ranking position of any regional governing body.

Following the first Madeiran regional elections the same year, which resulted in the Democratic Peoples' Party (now Social Democratic Party) having the majority of members of parliament, Emanuel Nascimento dos Santos Rodrigues was elected the first president of the Legislative Assembly. The position has since been held by members of the same party, which has never lost its majority. The current President is José Lino Tranquada Gomes, who is a member of the Assembly since 1988.

Two of the presidents were physicians (Nélio and Miguel Mendonça) and the other two were/are lawyers (Rodrigues and Tranquada Gomes) before taking office.

List of presidents 

The colors indicate the political affiliation of each president.

References and footnotes

Politics of Portugal
Madeira
Madeira-related lists
Presidents of the Legislative Assembly of Madeira
Madeiran politicians
List
Chairs of unicameral legislatures
Chairs of subnational legislatures